is a town located in Chikujō District, Fukuoka Prefecture, Japan.

As of April 30, 2017, the town has a population of 6,804 and a density of 1,200 persons per km². The total area is 5.68 km².

References

External links

Yoshitomi official website 

Towns in Fukuoka Prefecture